You Made Me Love You may refer to:

 You Made Me Love You (I Didn't Want to Do It), a  1913 song, written by James V. Monaco, the lyrics by Joseph McCarthy
 You Made Me Love You (film), a 1933 musical film